Plaza Singapura is a contemporary shopping mall located along Orchard Road, Singapore, next to Dhoby Ghaut MRT station. The mall is managed by CapitaLand and owned by CapitaMall Trust. There are retail outlets over seven floors and two basements. The mall has a 752 lot seven-storey carpark at the rear of the building, and a two basement goods bay beneath it. The mall is popular with families, teenagers and young adults.

The mall was first opened in 1974 and in 2012, it underwent an extensive revamp which included the construction of a new wing increasing retail space by 25 percent. It is one of the oldest malls located along Orchard Road.

History
Plaza Singapura was officially opened by then Minister for Finance, Hon Sui Sen in August 1975.

Architecture

In 2008, further changes were made to Plaza Singapura. Level 7 of the mall was given a face lift and tenants selling toys, gifts and hobby related items such as swords and cosplay costumes were introduced.

In 2012, Plaza Singapura underwent major renovation work which costs about S$ 150 million. The first phase signifies that the first three levels of Atrium@Orchard, which housed several offices, were converted to shop spaces. The second phase involves the former  Carrefour (after the exit on 30 September that year, it became a "missing" shop) converted to supermarket Cold Storage in Basement 2 and department store John Little in Level 1, which were completed in June 2013.

The mall has also been given a new façade with a 170-metre long wave frontage and features multi-coloured sculptures called the Jelly Baby Family by Italian artist Mauro Peruchetti.

In 2015, Plaza Singapura underwent interior upgrading works. Floor finishes, corridor lighting, toilets and lift lobbies were upgraded. More nursing rooms were added on Level 2.

Gallery

See also
 List of shopping malls in Singapore

References

External links
 

CapitaLand
Shopping malls in Singapore
Orchard Road
Museum Planning Area